Hagai Zamir (born 1951) is an Israeli paralympic volleyball champion.

Biography
Hagai Zamir was born on Kibbutz Zikim. He served with the IDF's Paratroopers Brigade. On January 2, 1970, during the War of Attrition, Zamir was sent with his unit to the island of Shadwan as part of Operation Rhodes. Zamir  and two comrades were injured by a mine. Zamir's left leg was amputated. After six months of rehabilitation he returned to the kibbutz and worked in the cotton fields. He also went back to playing volleyball, now on a team for the disabled.

Zamir is married and father of two. He was inducted into the International Jewish Sports Hall of Fame in 1997.

Sports career
Zamir was an active member of the disabled volleyball team for 30 years, taking part in seven Paralympic Games. He  is a certified volleyball and tennis coach. He has been teaching in schools since 1982 and in 1992 he also became a coach of Kfar Saba's municipal team. Several of his teams won national championships.

See also
Sports in Israel
List of select Jewish volleyball players

References

External links
 
 Hagai Zamir at World ParaVolley

1951 births
Living people
Israeli amputees
Israeli men's volleyball players
Israeli sitting volleyball players
Men's sitting volleyball players
Volleyball coaches
Jewish volleyball players
Paralympic gold medalists for Israel
Paralympic silver medalists for Israel
Paralympic volleyball players of Israel
Paralympic medalists in volleyball
Volleyball players at the 1976 Summer Paralympics
Volleyball players at the 1980 Summer Paralympics
Volleyball players at the 1984 Summer Paralympics
Volleyball players at the 1988 Summer Paralympics
Volleyball players at the 1992 Summer Paralympics
Volleyball players at the 1996 Summer Paralympics
Volleyball players at the 2000 Summer Paralympics
Medalists at the 1976 Summer Paralympics
Medalists at the 1980 Summer Paralympics
Medalists at the 1984 Summer Paralympics
Medalists at the 1988 Summer Paralympics
People from Southern District (Israel)